Herbert Allen may refer to:

Herbert A. Allen Sr. (1908–1997), American stockbroker
Herbert Allen Jr. (born 1940), American businessman
Herbert Allen (inventor) (1907–1990), American inventor
Herbert Allen III, American businessman
Herbert Allen, one of two British executioners of the 1950s named "Harry Allen"
H. Stanley Allen (1873–1954), English physicist
Todd Allen (baseball) (Herbert Todd Allen, 1885–1971), Negro leagues third baseman

See also

Bert Allen (disambiguation)